The 2000–01 Cypriot Second Division was the 46th season of the Cypriot second-level football league. Alki Larnaca won their 3rd title.

Format
Fourteen teams participated in the 2000–01 Cypriot Second Division. All teams played against each other twice, once at their home and once away. The team with the most points at the end of the season crowned champions. The first three teams were promoted to 2001–02 Cypriot First Division and the last three teams were relegated to the 2001–02 Cypriot Third Division.

Changes from previous season
Teams promoted to 2000–01 Cypriot First Division
 Digenis Morphou
 Aris Limassol
 Doxa Katokopias

Teams relegated from 1999–2000 Cypriot First Division
 Ethnikos Assia
 Anagennisi Deryneia
 Alki Larnaca

Teams promoted from 1999–2000 Cypriot Third Division
 THOI Lakatamia
 Rotsidis Mammari
 Kinyras Empas

Teams relegated to 2000–01 Cypriot Third Division
 PAEEK FC
 Iraklis Gerolakkou

League standings

Results

See also
 Cypriot Second Division
 2000–01 Cypriot First Division
 2000–01 Cypriot Cup

Sources

Cypriot Second Division seasons
Cyprus
2000–01 in Cypriot football